George Cecil Harris (3 March 1906 – 18 November 1994) was an English first-class cricketer who played in four matches for Worcestershire in 1925.

He did little, bowling only 31 overs in total and taking only two wickets. Both of these came in the first innings of a match against Derbyshire; his victims were Jim Hutchinson

and James Horsley. With the bat he was hopeless, his career scores being 0, 0*, 4, 0*, 1*, 0, 1 and 0. He claimed only one catch, to dismiss Harry Howell of Warwickshire.

Harris was born in Droitwich, Worcestershire; he died at the age of 86 in Worcester.

External links
 

1906 births
1994 deaths
English cricketers
People from Droitwich Spa
Worcestershire cricketers
Sportspeople from Worcestershire